George Henry Lesch (1909–1994) was the president and CEO of the Colgate-Palmolive company from 1961 to 1974, and was also the chairman of the board of the company from 1961 to 1974. He was featured on the cover of Forbes magazine in 1966.

References

1909 births
1994 deaths
American chief executives of manufacturing companies
Colgate-Palmolive
20th-century American businesspeople
Gies College of Business alumni
University of Illinois Urbana-Champaign alumni